Eastern Suburbs (now known as the Sydney Roosters) competed in the 26th New South Wales Rugby League(NSWRL) premiership in 1933.

Details

Line-up contained - ?????(coach); Cyril Abotomey, W. Anderton, Perc Atkinson, Sam Bryant, Dave Brown, Richard Brown, John Clarke, G. Court, Jack 'Buster' Cragie, Hilton Delaney, Bill Dyer, Jack Fay, J. Guinery, Bob Halloway, Harley Hanrahan, John Lane, Jack Morrison, Max Nixon, Ernie Norman, Sid ' Joe' Pearce, Ray Stehr, Viv Thicknesse, Harry Thompsons, Fred Tottey, Laurie Ward, Wood

Ladder

References

External links
Rugby League Tables and Statistics

Sydney Roosters seasons
East